Below is a list of villages and neighbourhoods in Tuvalu. There are no cities in Tuvalu.

 Alapi
 Angafoulua
 Asau
 Fakai Fou
 Fangaua
 Fenua Tapu
 Fongafale
 Funafuti - Capital
 Kulia
 Lolua
Niulakita
 Savave
 Senala
 Tanrake
Tokelau
 Tonga
 Tumaseu
 Vaiaku

References

	

		

Lists of cities by country
Lists of cities in Oceania
Tuvalu